Akatsi South (formerly part of Avenor-Ave) is one of the constituencies represented in the Parliament of Ghana. It elects one Member of Parliament (MP) by the first past the post system of election. Akatsi South is located in the Akatsi district of the Volta Region of Ghana.

Boundaries
The seat is located entirely within the Akatsi district of the Volta Region of Ghana.

Members of Parliament

Elections

 

 
  
 
 
 

 
 

There was a by-election in February 2012 as Edward Adjaho had been elected Speaker of the Parliament of Ghana at the beginning of the fourth parliament of the Fourth Republic.

 
  
 

 
 

 
  
 

 
 

The Electoral Commission of Ghana made changes to the constituencies following the national census in 2010. The total number of constituencies increased by 45 from 230 to 275. The Avenor-Ane became the Akatsi South constituency with Akatsi North carved out of it.

See also
List of Ghana Parliament constituencies

References 

Adam Carr's Election Archives
GhanaWeb

Parliamentary constituencies in the Volta Region